Sadio Doumbia and Fabien Reboul were the defending champions but chose not to defend their title.

Titouan Droguet and Kyrian Jacquet won the title after defeating Nicolás Barrientos and Miguel Ángel Reyes-Varela 6–2, 6–3 in the final.

Seeds

Draw

References

External links
 Main draw

Open du Pays d'Aix - Doubles
2022 Doubles